Kjetil Dale Sagstad, better known by his stage name Polar or K, is a Norwegian electronic music artist. He is originally from Meland in Norway, and grew up with his former musical partner Teebee. Together he started Subtitles Recordings, which Teebee now runs by himself. He currently lives in Bergen.

Labels: Certificate 18, Subtitles Recordings, Breakbeat Science, Levitated, Moving Shadow, R&S Records, Beatservice, Rugged Vinyl, Warm Communications, Fenetik (Soma), FAT! Records, Metaformal

Background

After initially surfacing on Hopa & Bones's A-Level imprint in '96, Kjetil Sagstad, aka "K" or "Polar", notched up a tally of releases on several labels, developing a trademark sound in beats and progressive drum n bass, earning him comparisons to Carl Craig, among others.

Originally from Bergen, on the West Coast of Norway, K was baptized by the local rave scene (albeit a very small one) and intense early breakbeat and techno. He quit school to pursue a sonic education, and started on a career path that would see him influence the scene that so clearly touched him in the first place. After his Dad nicked his gear off him as penance for his non-orthodox scholarly aspirations, K used his mate Teebee's PC to make tunes. After developing contact with Moving Shadow and Rugged Vinyl, K released Jazzassins 'Compass' for R&S Records in 1997.

Releases followed on Beatservice and Moving Shadow, his track was snapped up by the likes of Gilles Peterson, Amon Tobin, Matrix, Laurent Garnier and Fabio, and highlighted the direction of Polar's venture into glacial soundscapes and haunting programming. The mini LP '37 Degrees and Falling' followed, with the influence of K's home environment of Norway ever present in his sound, and planting him firmly on the musical map with intense atmospherics and powerful beat arrangements. Singles 'Mind Of A Killer', 'Skydiver', and '5am', released throughout 2000, illustrated the irrevocable, irreversible slide back from the thaw, heading into numbing yet taut K-hole serenity. 2001 saw the release of the acclaimed 'Still Moving' album, achieving support and recognition from a wide spectrum of scenes, not just from within drum n bass.

The 'White Chambers' EP was released in December '01: this was three cuts of deep, downtempo electronica. Moody, emotional and brooding - like a film noir soundtrack infused with hip hop and drum'n'bass - the tracks were lifted from the CD version of 'Still Moving' and created waves throughout the electronic world, with Polar being hailed as "Kruder & Dorfmeister on an iceberg" (Seven Magazine). It also featured a remix by Ian Simmons aka Journeyman. 

In 2002, K relocated to San Francisco while working on his 3rd solo album 'Out of the Blue'. 
Tragically this would be his last for the next 6 years due to a hearing injury. That same year also saw Polar releases on Metaformal, Breakbeat science, Thermal Recordings, Fenetik, FAT! and his own label Subtitles Music, founded together with childhood friend Dj Teebee.

K is suffering from reduced hearing, Hyperacusis and Tinnitus as a result of a hearing injury he
originally got in 1999. In 2002 it took an  unexpected turn for the worse, and he was left unable to spend any time in the studio. He left the administration of Subtitles to partner Teebee in 2003.

The return to drum & bass

After a year of online rumors that there might be some new Polar material in the works, 2008 saw the release of a 4th Polar solo LP titled 'In the end' on Warm Communications out of Amarillo, Texas.

Discography (Albums only)

 Black Science Beatservice (with Teebee) (1999)
 37°C. And Falling Certificate 18 (2000)
 Still Moving Certificate 18 (2001)
 Out Of The Blue Certificate 18 (2002)
 Dj Teebee & K - Presents the deeper side of drum & bass Subtitles Music (2002)
 In the end Warm Communications (November 2008)

References

External links 
 
 
 
 
 Official Facebook Page
 Official Soundcloud Page
 Certificate 18 profile
 Moving Shadow profile

Drum and bass musicians
Norwegian electronic musicians
Living people
People from Meland
Year of birth missing (living people)